South Madison is an unincorporated community in Boone County, West Virginia, United States.

References 

Unincorporated communities in West Virginia
Unincorporated communities in Boone County, West Virginia